Paul Albert Hanvidge (born 15 June 1961) is a former Scottish professional darts player. His best achievement is reaching the quarter-finals of the Lakeside World Championship twice.

Career
Hanvidge was the 2005 German Open Champion and made his World Championship debut in 2004, losing a first round match to Jarkko Komula. He missed out on qualification for the event in 2005, but returned in 2006 and beat Co Stompé and Simon Whitlock before losing 3–5 to Shaun Greatbatch in the last eight.

He made the quarterfinals again in 2007, beating Martin Phillips and Albertino Essers before losing to 50-year-old qualifier, Phill Nixon, in the quarterfinals. He wore a black armband in memory of his mother, who had died on Christmas Day.

In 2008, he suffered a first-round exit, losing to Brian Woods, whose average of 96.51 was the highest of the first round. Hanvidge reached the final of the 2008 Norway Open, losing to Willy van de Wiel. Hanvidge was forced to qualify for the 2009 BDO World Championship, but fell three rounds short in a defeat to Paul Gibbs. Hanvidge reached the semifinals of the 2009 British Open, defeating John Walton and Daryl Gurney along the way. He was beaten by Martin Atkins. Hanvidge earned enough ranking points to secure a place in the 2010 BDO World Championship, but was beaten in the first round by Scott Waites while reportedly suffering a bout of dartitis.

World Championship results

BDO

 2004: 1st round (lost to Jarkko Komula 1–3)
 2006: Quarter-final (lost to Shaun Greatbatch 3–5)
 2007: Quarter-final (lost to Phill Nixon 4–5)
 2008: 1st round (lost to Brian Woods 0–3)
 2010: 1st round (lost to Scott Waites 0–3)

References

External links
Lakeside 2006 Championship brochure
Profile and stats on Darts Database

1961 births
Living people
Scottish darts players
People from Barrhead
British Darts Organisation players
Sportspeople from East Renfrewshire